2005 ACC tournament may refer to:

 2005 ACC men's basketball tournament
 2005 ACC women's basketball tournament
 2005 ACC men's soccer tournament
 2005 ACC women's soccer tournament
 2005 Atlantic Coast Conference baseball tournament
 2005 Atlantic Coast Conference softball tournament